The Trofeo Luis Puig is a single-day road bicycle race held in Valencian Community, Spain. Originally named the Gran Premio Valencia, it was held annually (except for 1980) from the first edition in 1969 until 2005, in which year it was promoted to be a 1.1 event on the UCI Europe Tour. It was then not run for 16 years, until re-introduced under the name Clàssica Comunitat Valenciana 1969, as the opening event of the 2021 UCI Europe Tour as a race of 1.2 status. In 2023, the race was upgraded to category 1.1.

Spanish rider Vicente Mata died after being hit by a car in the 1987 edition of the race.

Winners

References

UCI Europe Tour races
Recurring sporting events established in 1969
1969 establishments in Spain
Recurring sporting events disestablished in 2005
Cycle races in Spain
Sport in the Valencian Community
2005 disestablishments in Spain